Tsogtbazaryn Enkhjargal (born April 6, 1981 in Erdenebüren sum, Khovd aimag) is an amateur Mongolian freestyle wrestler, who competed in the women's flyweight category. Between 2001 and 2011, Enkhjargal had won a total of six medals (two golds, three silver, and one bronze) for the 46, 48, and 51 kg classes at the Asian Wrestling Championships. She also captured three bronze medals in the same division at the Asian Games (2002 in Busan, South Korea and 2006 in Doha, Qatar), and at the 2005 World Wrestling Championships in Budapest, Hungary.

Enkhjargal made her official debut for the 2004 Summer Olympics in Athens, where she placed second in the preliminary pool of the women's 48 kg class, against France's Angélique Berthenet, and Guinea-Bissau's Leopoldina Ross. Tsogtbazar, however, lost to Germany's Brigitte Wagner in the quarterfinal match, with a score of 0–3.

Four years after competing in her last Olympics, Enkhjargal qualified for her second Mongolian team, as a 27-year-old, at the 2008 Summer Olympics in Beijing, by claiming the gold medal in the flyweight division from the 2007 Asian Wrestling Championships in Bishkek, Kyrgyzstan. Enkhjargal received a bye for the second preliminary round of the women's 48 kg class, before she was pinned by Ukrainian wrestler and Olympic bronze medalist Iryna Merleni.

References

External links
 
Profile – International Wrestling Database
NBC 2008 Olympics profile

1981 births
Living people
Mongolian female sport wrestlers
Olympic wrestlers of Mongolia
Wrestlers at the 2004 Summer Olympics
Wrestlers at the 2008 Summer Olympics
Wrestlers at the 2002 Asian Games
Wrestlers at the 2006 Asian Games
Wrestlers at the 2010 Asian Games
Asian Games medalists in wrestling
People from Khovd Province
World Wrestling Championships medalists
Asian Games bronze medalists for Mongolia
Medalists at the 2002 Asian Games
Medalists at the 2006 Asian Games
Asian Wrestling Championships medalists
21st-century Mongolian women